The Fleet's In is a 1942 movie musical produced by Paramount Pictures, directed by Victor Schertzinger, and starring Dorothy Lamour and William Holden.  Although sharing the title of the 1928 Paramount film starring Clara Bow and Jack Oakie, it was not a remake.  It was actually the second film version of the 1933 Kenyon Nicholson–Charles Robinson stage play Sailor, Beware!, enlivened with songs by Schertzinger and lyricist Johnny Mercer. The score, under the musical direction of Victor Young, includes the popular hits "Tangerine", and "I Remember You".

Jimmy Dorsey and his band are prominently featured in the movie. Supporting cast members include Eddie Bracken, singers Betty Jane Rhodes and Cass Daley, and Betty Hutton in her film debut.

This was the final film of Schertzinger's long directorial career. He died in October 1941, before this production's release.

Plot
When unassuming sailor Casey Kirby goes backstage for a famous actress' autograph, he winds up kissing her for a publicity photo. The photo circulates, and Kirby earns a reputation as a ladies man among his fellow sailors. They bet on the chances of him kissing the stand-offish star "The Countess" of the Swingland club during a four-day leave in San Francisco. When they arrive in San Francisco, Kirby attempts to win the bet and finds that he has earnestly fallen in love with the Countess and wants to marry her. Their romance is complicated by the Countess finding out about the bet and assuming that his advances are only to win the bet, although she finds that she has fallen in love with him.

Cast
 Dorothy Lamour as the Countess
 William Holden as Casey Kirby
 Eddie Bracken as Barney Waters
 Betty Hutton as Bessie
 Betty Jane Rhodes as Diana Golden
 Barbara Britton as Eileen
 Jimmy Dorsey as himself
 Cass Daley as Cissie (uncredited)

References

External links

1942 films
1942 musical comedy films
American musical comedy films
American romantic musical films
American black-and-white films
American films based on plays
Films directed by Victor Schertzinger
Films set in San Francisco
Paramount Pictures films
Films about the United States Navy
1940s romantic musical films
1940s English-language films
1940s American films